Peter Shepherd may refer to:

Peter Shepherd (racing driver) (born 1986), Canadian NASCAR driver
Peter Shepherd (British Army officer) (1841–1879), Surgeon Major
Peter Shepherd, character in Jumanji

See also
Peter Shepheard (1913–2002), British architect
Peter Sheppard (disambiguation)